Jason Arday FRSA (born 1985) is a British sociologist, writer and fundraiser best known for his research on race and racism. In March 2023, he began an appointment as Professor of Sociology of Education at the University of Cambridge, UK, becoming the youngest black person ever appointed to a professorship at Cambridge. He had previously been a Professor of Sociology of Education at the University of Glasgow in the College of Social Sciences, and before that Associate Professor of Sociology and Deputy Executive Dean (People and Culture) in the Faculty of Social Science and Health at the University of Durham, as well as Visiting Professor at Nelson Mandela University in the Centre for Critical Studies in Higher Education Transformation, South Africa.

Early life 

Arday was born in 1985 and grew up on a council estate in Clapham, South London. He was diagnosed as autistic at 3 years old and due to global developmental delay learned to speak at the age of 11 and to read and write at the age of 18.

Research and career

Education and early career 

Arday completed his undergraduate degree in Education Studies with Physical Education at the University of Surrey, before going on to study for a Master of Arts (MA) degree in Education at St Mary's University, Twickenham and Postgraduate Certificate in General Education (PGCE) at the Institute of Education.  He completed his Masters in Education (MEd) at Liverpool John Moores University, where he was also awarded a Doctorate in Philosophy (PhD) in Education.  He is a Fellow of the Higher Education Academy (fHEA).

In 2017, Arday was paired with MP and Shadow Minister for Mental Health Rosena Allin-Khan through the Operation Black Vote MP Shadowing Scheme. The scheme, for which there was "huge demand for places", is a selective training programme for "the next generation of political leaders" that develops individuals in areas such as policy, public speaking, media community activism and lobbying.  Today, Arday sits on the Centre for Labour and Social Studies (CLASS) National Advisory Panel.

Research interests 
Arday has research interests and publications in intersecting areas across education, social mobility, mental health and race.  He has conducted research into Black students' experiences across universities and is outspoken about the "omission" of people of colour in the Academy and the enduring effects of racial discrimination.

Arday is known for his report for The Black Curriculum, which received widespread media interest.  The report "explores how the current History National Curriculum systematically omits the contribution of Black British history in favour of a dominant White, Eurocentric curriculum that fails to reflect our multi-ethnic and broadly diverse society".  Arday continues to lobby for decolonisation of the curriculum.

In 2019 Arday brought together two key areas of interest, race, music and 1990s popular culture, to write Cool Britannia and Multi-ethnic Britain: Uncorking the Champagne Supernova.  He has written a number of other books and chapters relating to race and racism.

Appointments 
As well as his previous roles at the University of Glasgow and University of Durham, Arday is a Visiting Professor at the Nelson Mandela University and a Trustee of both the Runnymede Trust and British Sociological Association (BSA).  He is also an Editorial Board Member for Sociology (journal) and a Fellow of the Royal Society of Arts (RSA). In Autumn 2021, Arday was announced as Professor of Sociology of Education at University of Glasgow, making him one of the youngest Professors in the UK and the youngest Black Professor in Britain at the time of his appointment. In March, 2023, he was appointed to a professorship at the University of Cambridge, UK.

Fundraising and charity work 
In 2010, Arday ran 30 marathons in 35 days to raise money for Shelter and the Shooting Star Children’s Hospice.  His inspiration to support these charities came from a visit when he was 17 years old to a homeless shelter, where he "was surprised to see people my age struggling for something as fundamental as a roof over their head." He chose to support Shelter, saying that he “needed to do something to help people by supporting Shelter’s work with homeless and badly housed families".

By 2020, Arday raised a total of £4.5m for 70 different charities. This led to him meeting Andy Murray and being featured on ITV family programme Surprise Surprise.  Arday remains a long-standing trustee of the Runnymede Trust, the UK's leading race equality think tank.

Selected publications 

 "Cool Britannia and Multi-Ethnic Britain: Uncorking the Champagne Supernova. Abingdon: Routledge, 2019.
 "Fighting the tide: Understanding the difficulties facing Black, Asian and Minority Ethnic (BAME) Doctoral Students’ pursuing a career in Academia". Educational Philosophy and Theory 1, 2020.
 The Black Curriculum: Black British History in the National Curriculum Report. London: The Black Curriculum, 2020.
 "No One Can See Me Cry: Understanding Mental Health Issues for Black and Ethnic Minority Academic Staff in Higher Education". Higher Education, 2021.

References 

1985 births
Academics of Durham University
Academics of the University of Glasgow
Alumni of Liverpool John Moores University
Alumni of St Mary's University, Twickenham
Alumni of the University of Surrey
Black British academics
English sociologists
English writers
Living people
People on the autism spectrum